Clive Young (31 May 1948 – 7 October 2015) was a Church of England bishop. From 1999 to 2013, he was the Anglican Bishop of Dunwich, a suffragan bishop in the Diocese of St Edmundsbury and Ipswich.

Early life
Young was educated at King Edward VI Grammar School, Chelmsford. He then studied at St John's College, Durham and graduated in 1970 with a Bachelor of Arts (BA) degree. He then entered Ridley Hall, Cambridge, an Anglican theological college, to prepare for ordination.

Ordained ministry
Young was ordained a deacon in 1972 and began his career with a curacy at Neasden (1972-1975), followed by a second curacy at St Paul's Hammersmith (1975-1979). He was then Priest in charge of Old Ford, London, latterly also Area Dean of Tower Hamlets; and then Vicar of St Andrew, Holborn and Archdeacon of Hackney.

In 1999, he was consecrated to the episcopate. From 1999 until his retirement on 12 May 2013, he was the Anglican Bishop of Dunwich, a suffragan bishop in the Diocese of St Edmundsbury and Ipswich. He then retired from full-time ministry and was appointed an honorary assistant bishop in the Diocese of Hereford.

He was a member of the Hymn Society of Great Britain and Ireland, acting as its conference chaplain in 2001.

Personal life
In his spare time he was a keen gardener.

Young died on 7 October 2015. His funeral took place at Dore Abbey in Abbey Dore, Golden Valley, Herefordshire. He is buried in the Abbey's churchyard.

Styles
 The Reverend Clive Young (1972–1992)
 The Venerable Clive Young (1992–1999)
 The Right Reverend Clive Young (1999–2015)

References

1948 births
Alumni of St John's College, Durham
Archdeacons of Hackney
Bishops of Dunwich
2015 deaths
People educated at King Edward VI Grammar School, Chelmsford
21st-century Church of England bishops